Abdulaziz Ahmad Al Masha'an Al Enezi (born 19 October 1988), better known as Aziz Mashaan is a Kuwaiti footballer who plays as a midfielder for Al Qadsia.

Club career
Began playing with the club Qadsia at the age of six. Abdulaziz joined R.E. Mouscron in Belgium for a year, he faced financial problems with the club and went back to Al Qadsia. He is known for his speed and ball control.

Abdulaziz plays in Czech Republic since January 2013 in club 1. FK Příbram where he signed for 2 years, became the first Kuwaiti to play professional football in Europe. He scored two goals during his league debut at home against FK Teplice on 2 March 2013. Příbram won the match 3–1.

In June 2013, Al Masha'an was selected as the fourth best foreign player in the Czech Premier League.

International career

International goals
Scores and results list Kuwait's goal tally first.

References

1988 births
Living people
Kuwaiti footballers
Royal Excel Mouscron players
1. FK Příbram players
Sportspeople from Kuwait City
Qadsia SC players
2011 AFC Asian Cup players
2015 AFC Asian Cup players
Kuwait international footballers
Association football midfielders
Al Salmiya SC players
Al Jahra SC players
Al-Nasr SC (Kuwait) players
Czech First League players
Kuwaiti expatriate sportspeople in the Czech Republic
Expatriate footballers in the Czech Republic
Kuwaiti expatriate footballers
R.E. Mouscron players
Belgian Pro League players
Expatriate footballers in Belgium
Kuwaiti expatriate sportspeople in Belgium